Altanochir (1887–?) was an Inner Mongolian politician under the Republic of China and the Mengjiang government.

Names
Historical sources refer to him by a variety of names:
Altanochir or Altan Ochir, his Mongolian name
Altanvachir or Altan Vachir, an earlier transcription of his Mongolian name
Chin Yung-chang, his Chinese name

Career
When Altanochir was in his youth, he was one of a small number of Mongolian students sent to Japan under the sponsorship of Prince Gungsangnorbu of Right Harqin Banner. He would go on to become a member of the Inner Mongolian People's Revolutionary Party. He would go on to join the Mengjiang government in 1937, and rose to the position of Minister of Communications in 1939. He also served as first head of the Mongolian Cultural Centre (蒙古文化館) in Hohhot. In September 1939, he was succeeded by Idchin (伊德欽) in that position, and became rector of the Mongolian Academy (蒙古學院).

Altanochir was known to have remained in mainland China following the establishment of the People's Republic of China in 1949, but his fate after that point is unknown. His son Togtakhu (托克托琥) was active in the Kuomintang, and went on to teach at the Mongolian and Tibetan School in Beijing.

References

Bibliography

1887 births
Year of death missing
Date of death missing
Mengjiang
People from Chifeng
Republic of China politicians from Inner Mongolia
Mongol collaborators with Imperial Japan